Ginger Finds a Home is a 2003 children's picture book by Charlotte Voake. A prequel of Voakes 1996 picture book Ginger, it concerns a young stray cat called Ginger that becomes part of a girl's household.

Reception
Reviews of Ginger Finds a Home have been positive. Library Media Connection recommended it and wrote "A simply illustrated and written book shows how Ginger finds love and friendship through building a trusting relationship." A reviewer for Booklist affirmed Voake's illustrative style writing "Neophyte picture-book artists who cram the pages with saturated colors and busy details have a lot to learn from Voake's economical approach, which makes it easy for young children to sense the characters' emotions and to care about the story's outcome."

Ginger Finds a Home has also been reviewed by Kirkus Reviews, Publishers Weekly, School Library Journal, Horn Book Guides, and Magpies.

References

External links
Library holdings of Ginger Finds a Home

2003 children's books
British picture books
Books about cats